Vladimir Karp (born 9 October 1994) is a Belarusian professional footballer who plays as a forward for Osipovichi.

References

External links 
 
 

1994 births
Living people
Belarusian footballers
Footballers from Minsk
Association football forwards
FC BATE Borisov players
FC Isloch Minsk Raion players
FC Krumkachy Minsk players
FC Luch Minsk (2012) players
FC Naftan Novopolotsk players
FC Lida players
FC Osipovichi players
Belarusian First League players
Belarusian Premier League players
IV liga players
Belarusian expatriate footballers
Expatriate footballers in Poland
Belarusian expatriate sportspeople in Poland